Quantel were a company based in the United Kingdom and founded in 1973 that designed and manufactured digital production equipment for the broadcast television, video production and motion picture industries. They were headquartered in Newbury, Berkshire. The name Quantel came from Quantised Television, in reference to the process of converting a television picture into a digital signal.

Quantel acquired Snell Limited in March 2014. Following a period of consolidation the two companies started operating under the Snell name, trading as Snell Advanced Media or SAM, from September 2015, following the staged removal of the Quantel board of directors by incoming CEO Ray Cross.

History 

Quantel founder, Peter Michael, had previously founded Micro Consultants Group (MCG). MCG had pioneered a range of fast data conversion products that could be used for converting video signals from analog to digital and back to analog. These devices found use in many early Quantel products.

In the 1980s, Michael merged Quantel along with his other interests such as Link Electronics Ltd into the UEI Group of companies.

Michael became chairman with Quantel remaining a privately owned company of the publicly quoted UEI. Under the leadership of Richard Taylor OBE, chairman from 1975 and Paul Kellar MBE, Quantel made several pioneering firsts in video:

 In 1975, it released the first all-digital framestore, the Quantel DFS 3000. It was first introduced in TV coverage of the 1976 Montreal Olympics to generate a picture-in-picture inset of the Olympics' flaming torch while the rest of the picture featured the runner entering the stadium. Framestore technology provided the cornerstone for the future development of digital television products.
 In 1981, it released the Paintbox, an extremely advanced television graphics system for its time. Paintboxes are still in use today due to their image quality, and versatility. The Weather Channel was the first customer in the United States to purchase a Paintbox in 1982 (they had serial number '1' in the USA), which was used to generate its on-air weather maps during their first years of operation. MTV was another early customer of the Paintbox.
 When the BBC weather department decided to move from magnetic weather symbols on a board in 1985 to a complete digital solution it used modified Paintboxes which were controlled via Apple Lisa computers. The weather presenter then stood in front of a blue screen holding a button that was connected to the Lisa; which then in turn communicated with the Paintbox to bring up the next slide.
 In 1985, Quantel released the "Harry" effects compositing system/non-linear editor. The Harry was designed to edit in real time and render special effects in non-real time using the video recorded on its built-in hard disk array (much like most computer based non-linear editing systems today). The hard disk array used drives made by Fujitsu, and were connected to the Harry using a proprietary parallel interface, much like a modern-day RAID array. Technically, it was the first all-digital non-linear editing system. Due to technical constraints of the time, the Harry could only record 80 seconds of video, albeit encoded in full broadcast-quality, uncompressed D1-style 8-bit CCIR 601 format. This aside, the Harry was quite an advanced machine, and the only system like it for its time.
 In 1992, Quantel released "Henry", the first multilayer compositing system, which became the worldwide industry standard for commercials production and went on to win the British government's Queen's Award for Export Achievement, Quantel's ninth such award.

This period until 1998 marked the high point of the company's profitability, size and market position, placing it in the top handful of broadcast vendors. The company had a global presence with major offices, staff and facilities on the east and west coast of the US, in Paris, Tokyo, London, Seoul, Hong Kong and Sydney, plus other overseas resources. There was a private air operation - Quantel Aviation - based in Farnborough which included a private Cessna Citation executive jet. However, as software based products began to gain ground in Quantel's then core businesses of compositing, graphics and news editing, the company was not able to maintain this position.

Recent history 

In 1989 Quantel had been acquired from UEI by Carlton Communications which had also acquired high end sound console manufacturer Solid State Logic as part of the same deal. This relationship ended in 2000 when Quantel management bought the company back for $76.6m funded by Lloyds Banking Group venture capital arm LDC.

From 2000 to 2005, Quantel then specialised in:

 sQ - Video server based system for the broadcast industry which is designed for all forms of fast turnaround production, such as sports and news
 Newsbox - Complete news production system in a box
 iQ - Used for digital intermediate film work
 eQ - Used for post production and TV commercial work
 Pablo - Color grading system
 Mission - A media and asset management system for handling media in large systems

December 2005 saw the forced departure from the board of long-standing chairman and chief executive Richard Taylor OBE by owners LDC in conjunction with Ray Cross - who had worked as an external consultant with Taylor and LDC to create the business plan to present to Lloyds for the 2000 management buyout from Carlton. Taylor was subsequently diagnosed with cancer in December 2008 and died in June 2009.

Research and development director Paul Kellar MBE, who had been key to Quantel's previous technology leadership, was replaced by Cross with another Quantel employee, Neil Hinson. Hinson had joined Quantel in 1980 and played a pivotal part in the design of many of the most successful Quantel products including Harry, Henry, Mirage and Clipbox as well as the later generationQ family of products but was also quickly replaced by Cross with another Quantel employee, Simon Rogers in December 2008.

In the autumn of 2008 Cross made a sizeable round of redundancies, saying that the company was moving towards being more software based. Cross engaged in another round of redundancies in April 2009, giving the reason that the global recession has been deeper than had been planned for. Cross made further redundancies in October 2012, as its quarterly results were not as good as expected.  
  
In March 2014 Quantel acquired Snell Ltd. also owned by Lloyds, and began the consolidation of the two companies. Cross made further redundancies, primarily in the former Snell organisation. Like Quantel, Snell (as Snell and Wilcox) had formerly been a major player in the broadcast space but also like Quantel had seen a long-term decline in its market position and profitability. Although both companies produced media technology, each had quite separate but complementary products.

In its heyday under Taylor, Quantel was ranked in the top four broadcast vendors and had one of the strongest brand names. Finally after almost 10 years of Cross downsizing Quantel and after apparently several failed attempts to sell the business, Cross himself was forcibly removed in March 2015 - allegedly partly following senior staff complaints about Cross to backers Lloyds Development Capital -  and replaced by former Grass Valley CEO Tim Thorsteinson, chosen on a "proven track record of value creation". Thorsteinson subsequently sacked the entire Quantel board of directors. Finally in September 2015, the Quantel name was dropped and the residual business placed inside the Snell operation, branded as Snell Advanced Media (SAM). Thorsteinson has previously been involved in downsizing and restructuring other broadcast companies, such as Grass Valley and Harris, in order to prepare them for sale, which was the role LDC had originally brought Cross in to Quantel to achieve.

Timeline 

 1973 TBC 2000 / TBC 2200 - Time base corrector. 
 1975 DFS 3000 - Digital framestore synchroniser.
 1977 DSC 4002 - Digital video standards converter.
 1978 DPE 5000 - Digital processing effects. One of the first digital video effects systems.
 1981 Paintbox.
 1982 Mirage - 3D real-time video effects processor.
 1986 Harry - Non-Linear Editor.
 1989 Paintbox V - Second generation paintbox, faster and smaller.
 1990 Picturebox - Digital still store. Capacity is 520mb or 500 images. Increased to 1000 images with Picturebox twin.
 1990 Harriet - Manipulating live graphics over video. Capacity is 323 PAL frames (around 12 seconds).
 1992 Henry - Effects Editor which became the mainstay of the post industry across the world in the mid-nineties.
 1992 HAL - Video design suite. 
 1993 Dylan - RAID disk storage for video and audio.
 1993 Editbox - Online NLE.
 1993 Domino - A film- in, film-out digital film opticals system.
 1994 Clipbox - Multi-user video server.
 1995 Open Picturenet - Networking for Quantel products.
 1998 Inspiration - Integrated news and sports production system.
 2000 iQ - Media editing and compositing platform.
 2002 generationQ - Harnesses uncompressed storage through using Dylans, and runs on an 'open platform' allowing easier networking between machines, and file sharing. The new generation of products included the iQ, for digital intermediate. eQ for post and editing, and gQ, aimed towards the graphics market.
 2004 Enterprise sQ - second-generation fast-turnaround production system for news and sports applications. ESPN equips its new Bristol, CT Digital Center with Enterprise sQ HD production system.
 2005 Paintbox - New Paintbox launched which is a powerful design and compositing tool. Dealing with the moving image, and still images, this new Paintbox was named in honour of the original Paintbox created in 1981.
 2005 Newsbox - A complete television newsroom production system to record, edit and playout news material.
 2005 Pablo - Nonlinear Color grading system - Quantel's first fully featured color corrector.
 2005 Picturebox sQ - Graphics server for stills and moving sequences.
 2006 Pablo HD - High definition color grading system.
 2006 Newsbox HD - High definition capable version of Newsbox.
 2006 Marco - Software only DV field editor.
 2007 Mission - Media and asset management system.
 2007 Stereoscopic 3D - 3D post-production system.
 2008 Pablo Neo - Ergonomic ‘heads up’ control panel for Pablo post-production system.
 2010 QTube - Global media workflow technology, enabling viewing and editing of media from anywhere using the internet.
 2012 revolutionQ - Allows the use of 'off the shelf' IT storage rather than traditionally expensive Quantel dedicated video storage.
 2012 Pablo Rio (2015: Quantel Rio) - software color correction and finishing system.

Headquarters and manufacturing 

Quantel was based at 31 Turnpike Road, Newbury, Berkshire, England since 1982. The  building was built on the  site in 1940 for Vickers Armstrong and manufactured Spitfire fighter aircraft during World War II. Air raid shelters are still present in the grounds of the site. Other users of the building included the Post Office and the Ministry of Transport.

A large part of the site was dedicated to manufacturing. It is now very rare that companies manufacture their own products due to the complex nature of multiple layer circuit boards containing high density surface mounted components. It is more common now to design complex circuits on a computer and await delivery of a ready built board or simply use off the shelf IT.

As part of restructuring during the 1990s, Quantel decided to outsource support of legacy products to a separate company Effect Systems. Also based in Newbury and staffed by many ex Quantel staff, Effect Systems took over support for products. These include Editbox, Henry, Hal, Paintbox, Picturebox, Domino as well as older products dating back to the 1980s including Mirage, Harry and Encore. On 1 October 2008 Quantel ended the outsourcing contract with Effect Systems. Effect continued to offer independent support for Quantel legacy equipment (Paintbox V, Picturebox, Henry, Editbox and Domino) but has now ceased that support and in 2016 disposed of the inventory of spare parts.

Products 

Traditionally, Quantel systems were based around proprietary hardware and software. With the introduction of the generationQ range a number of Quantel products were based on Microsoft Windows and standard PC hardware with occasional use of custom hardware.

Quantel has always been very protective of its product designs and patents, especially relating to Paintbox-type functionality. This triggered a number of legal battles over the years, most notably against Spaceward Graphics and its Matisse system (won in 1990) and Adobe Systems and its Photoshop application (lost in 1997).

The majority of Quantel products used code names for some parts of their systems. One source of code names was the television series The Magic Roundabout. The Dylan disk system and the Zebedee processor take their names from characters in this series.

Quantel video technology was used extensively in production of the American television series Star Trek: The Next Generation.

Many of the major movies released since 1999 were created or manipulated using Quantel technology, including Star Wars episode 2 and 3, The Lord of the Rings: The Fellowship of the Ring, The Day After Tomorrow, and Sin City. Users of sQ server based systems include ESPN in the US, Rogers Media in Canada, and BBC, BSkyB and QVC in the United Kingdom.

Quantel-designed technologies include:

 Dynamic rounding - Dynamic rounding was a technique devised by Quantel for truncating the word length of pixels – an unavoidable process when processing images. Rather than simply losing the lower bits, dynamic rounding uses their information to control, via a randomiser, the dither of the LSB of the truncated result. This effectively removes any artefacts that would otherwise be visible. Dynamic rounding is non-cumulative on any number of passes and produces statistically correct results. Dynamic rounding eliminates any truncation artefacts.
 FrameMagic - A system used on video servers where video clips are treated as individual frames rather than a single clip. This allows very efficient use of storage as only frames used in subsequent edits need to be kept from an original recording. This allows the rest of the unused frames to be discarded.
 TimeMagic - A background rendering system which renders editing effects as the operator continues working.
 Resolution Co-existence - Allows a video edit to be made up of different formats of source material without any extra work required by the operator. One example is an edit that will play out standard definition but some parts of the edit may be part of a high definition source clip.
 Genetic Engineering - A technology that allowed multiple users to work on the same media independently without having to have multiple copies of it.

References

External links 

 
 Effect Systems web site
 Video clip of Quantel public open day on 28 June 2006
 

Film and video technology
Quantel
Electronics companies established in 1973
Companies based in Newbury, Berkshire
1973 establishments in England